Michael L. Sorce (born September 18, 1958), better known by his stage name Don Geronimo, is an American radio personality  formerly featured on the nationally syndicated radio talk show Don and Mike Show.

Career
Geronimo began his career in radio at the age of 13 when he went to work at Rockville, Maryland AM station WINX (now WLXE, a Spanish-language music station).
He continued working at a variety of local stations, being fired at each for lacking the required FCC broadcaster's license, before forging a license.  Geronimo landed what was then his dream job at WLS-FM in Chicago, Illinois in the early 1980s.  He then moved to WBBM-FM (B96) to do the evening show.  Eventually, he replaced Dick Biondi doing morning drive at the same station.

Geronimo returned to the Washington, D.C. area in 1985, doing afternoons at WAVA-FM. He moved to mornings in 1986, replacing Charlie & Harrigan. His partnership with Mike O'Meara, co-host of the Don and Mike Show, was forged at WAVA. Their show moved to WJFK-FM in 1991.

Washington Post radio reporter Marc Fisher features Geronimo in his book Something in the Air, on the rise and fall of radio in the United States.  Fisher also conducted an interview with Geronimo prior to his first of three retirements, the first from The Don & Mike Show in 2008, during which Don spoke out about his frustration with the direction radio has taken following high profile decency events such as the Janet Jackson Super Bowl incident.

After only two months in retirement, Geronimo announced that he would return to the air on WOCM, a small, independently owned radio station in Ocean City, Maryland. Don Geronimo's Rockin' Soul Show featured popular music from the '70s and '80s.  Geronimo described the show as "music that doesn't suck". After one month on the air at WOCM, Geronimo was fired from the station over creative differences.  Don subsequently hosted a mid-morning talk show on WGMD (92.7 FM Rehoboth Beach, Delaware) from June 22, 2009 to October 13, 2009, when he retired for his second time, although he did some fill-in work at Classic Hits WCBS-FM in New York a few days in late November and December 2009.

Don Geronimo was named midday host of 1140 The Fan 1140 KHTK (AM), Sacramento effective on Monday, June 21, 2010.  The four-hour program was scheduled Monday through Friday, noon to 4 pm local time. On January 27, Geronimo announced that he would be a regular on the TV show Good Day Sacramento, with his first appearance on February 14, 2011.  On May 9, 2011, Geronimo announced that his contract with CBS was extended through 2014 and he was named Program Director for 1140 The Fan KHTK. As of July 11, 2011, Geronimo's show moved to the morning drive, 5:30–10 am local time after the "Rise Guys" left for a gig in San Francisco.    At the same time, Don also ended his in-studio presence on Good Day Sacramento.  He now occasionally contributes to GDS remotely via camera.  On July 8, 2013, Geronimo's show moved to the midday slot on KHTK and can now be heard from noon to 3:00 pm local time.

As of Friday, October 4, 2013, The Don Geronimo Show has been replaced by the Jason Ross show on CBS Sports Radio 1140 KHTK.  A caller asked what happened, and Jason Ross simply explained, "CBS Sports Radio decided to go in another direction, which is sports.  Don Geronimo is still employed by CBS Sports Radio."  On October 16, 2013, Don went on the air on KHTK in Sacramento to thank those who supported him during his time in Sacramento. He said he was going to be doing a new project with CBS in the near future and it would be announced via his Twitter feed. On October 23, Don appeared on 106.7 The Fan's Lavar and Dukes show to announce his return to the station after five years, where he would appear weekdays from 7–10 p.m. local time, Saturdays from 9 a.m.–noon local time, and during Washington Redskins pre/post-game shows as well.  On March 1, 2014, Geronimo stated that he would no longer be heard on WJFK anymore.  He announced on his Twitter feed that "No one should be shocked I'm not in the plans for CBS/DC. I had opined recently on air how I didn't understand the logic. Now 30 more days."

On September 10, 2021, iHeartMedia announced that Sorce will begin hosting the Don Geronimo Show on Washington, D.C. area radio station WBIG 100.3 mornings starting September 23, 2021. The show airs during the 5:30am-10am drive-time slot.

Radio history
Don has worked at the following stations:

Geronimo first appeared on air part-time on  WINX in Rockville, Maryland in 1971.  

In November and December 2009, Geronimo filled shifts on WCBS-FM in New York City.

Acting
Don has appeared in The Adventures of Brisco County, Jr., Babylon 5 and The King of Queens. He is a member of the Screen Actors Guild.  He has stated on several occasions on the Don and Mike Show that he and his partner at that time, Mike O'Meara, spoke without authorization during their Babylon 5 taping, which was supposed to have been a non-speaking role for each.  Rather than re-shoot the scene, the show's producers arranged for their union memberships.  This paved the way for a speaking role on The King of Queens, where he spoke one line, "Lookin' good, Heffernan!" He has also co-hosted with Marty Bass post-game coverage of the Baltimore Ravens games for WJZ-TV (Channel 13).

Personal life

Family
Don's first wife, Freda, died on July 10, 2005, in an automobile accident on Maryland Route 90 near Ocean City, Maryland, where the Sorces had their vacation home. Freda was a frequent contributor to the Don and Mike Show and her spirited interaction with Don was an integral part of the program. Following her death, Don took a hiatus from the show until August 1, 2005, when he returned to the air with an emotional solo broadcast.

Don married Janet Sorce on March 21, 2009,  and has one son (Bart Sorce) and one daughter (Amy) from previous marriages.

On Friday, October 22, 2010, during the Don Geronimo live stage show Don slipped and fell off the stage.  Don suffered head trauma and was admitted to a local hospital and later transferred to ICU.

Controversy
In 1994, Geronimo and his then radio partner Mike O'Meara were sued for $35 million by an anonymous University of Maryland student who claimed the pair had violated her privacy and inflicted emotional distress.
In May 2007, a Leesburg, Virginia man named Carl Grossman, who had once been a frequent caller to the Don and Mike Show, pleaded guilty to a misdemeanor charge of stalking.  Geronimo had received a letter from the man which contained threats to Geronimo and his family.  The judge also issued a lifetime restraining order in the case.

Retirements and returns
On February 4, 2008, Don announced his retirement from his radio show to pursue his personal life for a while.  His last appearance on the Don and Mike Show was Friday, April 11, 2008, with Mike O'Meara to continue the show after that (as the Mike O'Meara Show).  Don was widely expected to return to radio in some form in the future.

After only two months in retirement, Geronimo announced that he would return to the air on WOCM, a small, independently owned radio station in Ocean City, Maryland. Don Geronimo's Rockin' Soul Show aired weekdays from 1 pm – 3pm featuring popular music from the 1970s and 1980s. After four weeks, Geronimo left the station.

In May 2010, Geronimo announced that beginning June 21, he would be returning to KHTK, a station which formerly syndicated the Don and Mike Show, to host a mid-day show.

As of Friday, October 4, 2013, The Don Geronimo Show was replaced by the Jason Ross show on CBS Sports Radio 1140 KHTK. Geronimo would return to the airwaves several days later to explain that KHTK decided to go with all sports programming, but that he would return to a CBS Radio station soon.

Don Geronimo returned to WJFK-FM on October 24, 2013.  His sports-oriented show aired weekdays from 7– 10 pm and on Saturdays from 9:00 am to noon. Initially, he broadcast the show from a studio at CBS Radio's main building in Sacramento at Commerce Circle, then from a studio at his home in Sacramento when CBS internal politics prevented the show from being done at the company's building.  Co-hosts for the show were located at WJFK's studios in Lanham, Maryland.  While it was intended that Geronimo would move to the Washington area to do the show live at WJFK's studios, this never materialized after frequent preemptions and schedule changes.  Geronimo announced on his Twitter feed on March 1, 2014, that he would no longer be heard on WJFK.  His last show had been broadcast on February 26, 2014.

On April 1, 2014, Geronimo began broadcasting a new show, also titled The Don Geronimo Show, via podcast on the RELM Network.  The show airs live weekdays from 3:00 pm until 5:00 pm ET.  The show is a commercial-free, uncensored, subscription-based podcast that listeners can stream live or download for offline listening after the show airs.  The show was announced on Twitter as "the show I always wanted to do."
On September 13, 2019, Geronimo broadcast the last show of  The Don Geronimo Show stating the show is currently going on hiatus for other projects.

On November 16, 2021, the Don Geronimo Show began broadcasting in the 5:30-10:00 am morning drive-time slot at suburban Washington DC classic rock station WBIG-FM, an iHeart affiliate in Rockville MD located two miles from the station where Geronimo began his radio career at age 13.

References

External links
 Fans of the Don Geronimo Show
 The Don Geronimo Show
 Don Geronimo Show Twitter
 
 Interview on WUSA-TV 9:  

1958 births
American talk radio hosts
Radio personalities from Chicago

Radio personalities from Detroit
Living people
Radio personalities from Los Angeles
Place of birth missing (living people)
Radio personalities from Maryland
Radio personalities from New York City
Radio personalities from Pittsburgh

Radio personalities from Washington, D.C.
Shock jocks